Purple is a colour.

Purple may also refer to:

Business
 Purple (technology company), based in the UK
 Purple (magazine), a French fashion, art, and culture publication

Music
 Purple Records, a record label
 Purple (Baroness album), 2015
 Purple (Leslie Clio album), 2017
 Purple (Shizuka Kudo album), 1995
 Purple (Stone Temple Pilots album), 1994
 Purple (EP), by Mamamoo, 2017
 "Purple" (Pop Evil song), 2012
 "Purple" (Skin song), 2006
 "Purple", a song by Hyuna from Following, 2017
 "Purple", a song by Six60 from Six60, 2015

Other uses
 Norman H. Purple (1803–1863), American jurist
 Purple (cipher machine), American codename of a Japanese cipher machine used before and during World War II 
 Purple (government), a political term
 Purple.com, a website founded in 1994
 Northwestern Wildcats, formerly "The Purple", the sports teams of Northwestern University, Evanston, Illinois, US
 Peri Urban Regions Platform Europe, a network of European regions

See also
 Born in the purple, born to high title
 Purple Mountain (disambiguation)
 Purpure, a heraldic tincture equivalent to "purple"